Taching is the former romanization of Daqing, China.

Taching may also refer to:
Taching am See, a town in Bavaria, Germany.
Tachinger See or Lake Taching, a large lake in the district of Traunstein, Upper Bavaria, Germany.

See also
Daqing (disambiguation)